Back to the Outback is a 2021 computer-animated adventure comedy film directed by Clare Knight and Harry Cripps, in both their directorial debuts, from a screenplay written by Cripps, and a story by Gregory Lessans and Cripps. The voice cast includes Isla Fisher, Tim Minchin, Eric Bana, Guy Pearce, Miranda Tapsell, Angus Imrie, Keith Urban, and Jacki Weaver. Produced by Weed Road Pictures, Reel FX Creative Studios, Netflix Animation, and distributed by Netflix.

The film had a limited theatrical release on December 3, 2021, prior to streaming on Netflix on December 10, 2021, to a generally positive reception from critics and audiences.

Plot

At the Australian Wildlife Park in Sydney, zookeeper Chaz Hunt has a show that demonstrates scary and deadly animals. Maddie, a venomous inland taipan, appears regularly at the show but is feared by the public. Maddie is supported by Jackie, a motherly saltwater crocodile, who tells her and her three best friends —Frank, a funnel-web spider, Zoe, a thorny devil, and Nigel, a marbled scorpion— about the Outback, a place recognizable with three mountains where creatures like them belong. One day, Jackie is removed from the zoo after she tries to save Chaz's son, Chazzie but her efforts to help the boy out of that pit are interpreted as she was trying to eat him. Saddened and in despair, Maddie decides to escape to the Outback. During the escape, Pretty Boy, a celebrity koala, tries to alert the park's security but is paralyzed by Nigel and they decide to take him with them.

While crossing Sydney Harbour, they run into Jacinta, a great white shark, who is part of the Ugly Secret Society (USS) where animals considered "monsters" help each other upon hearing a password. When they reach Circular Quay, Pretty Boy tries to get the attention of the city for rescue but finds that the world believes he is dead and his popularity has been taken by a quokka, convincing him to tag along with them on the journey.

They get a ride from the outer suburbs on an excursion bus that takes them to the Blue Mountains. Chaz and Chazzie catch up and have the bus pulled over to search the vehicle for the creatures, but an Aboriginal girl allows them to escape. Just after Pretty Boy goes on a tirade about how Maddie and the other creatures ruined his life, Chaz ambushes them and almost sedates Maddie, but Pretty Boy says the USS password, which alerts some Tasmanian devils to their presence. After the animals escape, Chaz reveals to Chazzie that his adventurous and Aussie wildlife expert history was all a lie and he only moved from Florida to Australia after being inspired by television shows featuring Australian zookeepers. He decides to make it up to Chazzie by really going after the animals and bringing them back to the park, though Chazzie is no longer sure about the mission.

Over the next few days, the animals are helped by many creatures of the USS on their way to the Outback, while Pretty Boy bonds more with the creatures. One night, Maddie sings a lullaby that she had sung at the park ago & was her only memory of her mother: she was washed out of the nest as an egg by a flood and after a perilous journey, was found on the road by Chaz. Pretty Boy reveals that he was also orphaned, with his mother being killed by a moving car. The next day, Pretty Boy finds a tree of koalas and leaves the other creatures.

Maddie and the others reach the three mountains. Not long after they arrive, Chaz rounds up and captures Frank, Zoe, and Nigel. Chazzie runs into Maddie and is initially scared of her, but warms up to her upon seeing that she is just as scared as he is of her. Chaz captures Maddie as well and places the creatures in boxes in the back of a truck, but Chazzie sets Maddie free without his father looking. Maddie who broke down crying over losing her friends tries to get the animals of the land to help her rescue them, but they initially refused due to the fact none of them had ever left before. However, Pretty Boy, having found life with the other koalas not as great as he thought, returns. He cheers her up and asks her to go to the rescue. Using a fire truck, they catch up to the truck and break them out. When Maddie, Pretty Boy, and the other creatures save Chazzie from falling over the edge of a canyon, Chaz fully sees these creatures as heroes rather than dangers and decides to let them return to the wild.

At the three mountains, they reunite with Jackie, who is revealed to be the head of the USS & had escaped by knowing a few tricks to do so & then ordered the USS that she had founded during her lifetime to help the group on their journey, and they all join their new life in the Outback.

Cast

 Isla Fisher as Maddie, a kind-hearted, optimistic and sensitive inland taipan.
 Tim Minchin as Pretty Boy, a popular but self-obsessed koala who later has a change of heart.
 Guy Pearce as Frank, a lovelorn funnel-web spider. 
 Miranda Tapsell as Zoe, a smart, self-assured thorny devil.
 Angus Imrie as Nigel, a timid marbled scorpion. 
 Keith Urban as Doug, a cane toad who lives in a school.
 Jacki Weaver as Jackie, a motherly saltwater crocodile.
 Eric Bana as Chaz Hunt, a zookeeper who pursues the escaped animals and is known as the popular hero of his novels. He grew up in Tampa, Florida.
 Diesel La Torraca as Chazzie Hunt, Chaz's adventure-seeking son.
 Kylie Minogue as Susan, a razorback.
 Rachel House as Jacinta, a friendly great white shark with barnacles in her teeth.
 Aislinn Derbez as Legs, a redback spider.
 Lachlan Power as Dave, a tough Tasmanian devil.
 Aaron Pedersen as Clive, a dung beetle.
 Celeste Barber as Skylar, a koala.
 Jack Charles as a frilled-neck lizard
 Wayne Knight as Phil, a platypus
 John Leary and Liam Knight as the Kids, children visiting the zoo.
 Adelaide and Fletcher Kennedy as Zoo Girl and Zoo Boy, children visiting the zoo.

Production
Writer and director Harry Cripps had previously created the concept for the cancelled film Larrikins with DreamWorks Animation, which was also supposed to feature a score and music by Tim Minchin; the project was revived as a short film titled Bilby in 2018. In an interview with TheWrap, Cripps said that Larrikins had "focused on the cute animals, and so I didn't want to go back down that same road, I went to the dark side." Clare Knight, whose previous animated film experience includes her work as Lead Editor of the Kung Fu Panda franchise, said "A lot of executives would say to us, 'A snake? Snakes aren't huggable. Does your lead have to be a snake?' And it was a challenge for us that we really wanted to make these animals appealing."

Initially, while Netflix was concerned about the "huggability of the animal cast", both Knight and Cripps said that working for the streaming giant's animation unit was positively heavenly. "It's been great. Again, we're first-time directors, so Netflix is willing to give us a shot and give us a voice, so we really feel great. We would've felt if this was DreamWorks, we possibly would've been pigeonholed as writer and editor and not necessarily been given this chance. And the fact that we reached such a big, global audience with this great depiction of Australia I think, is a wonderful thing for us."

Soundtrack

The film's score was composed by Rupert Gregson-Williams. Executive producer Akiva Goldsman, as director, had previously worked with Rupert on Winter's Tale. Rupert had also previously composed the score for animated films such as Over the Hedge, Bee Movie, Open Season: Scared Silly, and Abominable.

The soundtrack features four original songs, including "Hello World" by Evie Irie and "Beautifully Ugly" by Tim Minchin and Irie.

All score tracks are composed by Rupert Gregson-Williams.

Notes
Several other songs were featured in the film and trailers but not included in the soundtrack album:
 "Zou Bisou Bisou" by Gillian Hills.
 "9 to 5" by Dolly Parton.
 "Bad Guy" by Billie Eilish.
 "Nails, Hair, Hips, Heels" by Todrick Hall
 "Against All Odds (Take a Look at Me Now)" by Phil Collins.
 "Justified & Ancient" by The KLF.
 "Take a Long Line" by The Angels.
 "Sussudio" by Phil Collins.

Release
On November 30, 2020, Netflix announced that its animated film Back to the Outback would make its world debut in late 2021. In October 2021, it was revealed that the film is set for a December 10, 2021 release. It also had a limited theatrical release on December 3, prior to its streaming release on Netflix.

In the week following its worldwide release, the film reached Top 10 Lists on Netflix in 64 countries, including Australia and the United States.

Critical reception
On the Rotten Tomatoes website, it has an approval rating of 82% based on 17 reviews, with an average rating of 6.10/10. On Metacritic it has a weighted average score of 58 out of 100, based on 4 critics, indicating "mixed or average reviews".

Brad Newsome of The Sydney Morning Herald said that the "Gorgeous character design and some delightful voice performances elevate this uneven CGI romp in which a bunch of “ugly” Australian animals break out of a zoo and head for the outback." Natalia Winkelman of The New York Times was also positive, writing: "However generic this movie is in premise, there is wit to be found in its details, and warmth in its message."

Luke Buckmaster of The Guardian was more critical, saying "ho-hum animation won’t thrill viewers whose age exceeds their shoe size." He gave the film a 2 out of 5 rating.

Accolades

References

External links
 
 

2021 films
2021 computer-animated films
2021 adventure films
2021 comedy films
2020s Australian animated films
2020s American animated films
Australian animated feature films
Australian comedy films
Netflix Animation films
Animated films about animals
Animated films about lizards
Animated films about crocodilians
Films set in New South Wales
Films about spiders
Australian computer-animated films
Films scored by Rupert Gregson-Williams
Animated films about koalas
Fictional marsupials
Animated films about snakes
Films set in Sydney
2020s English-language films
Films set in the Northern Territory